"The Call Up" is a song by English punk rock group the Clash. It was released as the first single from the band's fourth album, Sandinista!. The single was released in November 1980, in advance of the release of Sandinista!, with "Stop the World" as its B-side.

Re-releases
The single was reissued in 1981 in the U.S. by Epic Records (catalog number 02036) in 7" vinyl format and with a different cover. On the B-side of the US release was "The Cool Out", a dub of "The Call Up".

In addition to its inclusion on Sandinista!, "The Call Up" has been included on both The Clash on Broadway and The Singles. It is absent from The Essential Clash, although "Stop The World", its B-side that was not included on Sandinista, is included. "Stop The World" is also included on The Clash on Broadway and the B-side compilation Super Black Market Clash.

The single was reissued on CD as Disc 12 of Singles Box, complete with a re-creation of the original sleeve artwork, but omits "The Cool Out", making it the only disc in the set that does not include all non-UK released tracks. "The Cool Out" is however included on Disc 14 as part of the "Magnificent Seven" release.

Track listing
7" vinyl
 "The Call Up" – 5:26
 "Stop the World" – 2:32

12" vinyl (US)
 "The Call Up" – 4:50
 "The Cool Out" – 2:57
 "The Magnificent Dance" – 5:36
 "The Magnificent Seven" – 2:16

Personnel

"The Call Up"
 Joe Strummer – lead guitar, lead vocals
 Mick Jones – lead guitars, backing vocals, sound effects
 Norman Watt-Roy – bass guitar, backing vocals
 Topper Headon – drums, backing vocals

"Stop the World"
 Joe Strummer – vocal
 Mick Jones – guitars, sound effects
 Norman Watt-Roy – bass guitar
 Topper Headon – drums

Covers

The song was covered by Chris Whitley, using only voice and acoustic guitar, as track four on his 2004 release "War Crime Blues". It was also covered by The Lothars as track four, disc two of a compilation tribute album The Sandinista! Project.

Charts

References

Sources

 

1980 singles
1981 singles
Anti-war songs
The Clash songs
Protest songs
1980 songs
CBS Records singles